His 'n' Hers is the fourth studio album by English rock band Pulp, released on 18 April 1994 by Island Records. It proved to be the band's breakthrough album, reaching number nine on the UK Albums Chart, and was nominated for the 1994 Mercury Music Prize. In 1998, Q magazine readers voted it the seventieth greatest album of all time, while it was placed at number 110 in the book Virgin All-Time Top 1000 Albums.

Themes and content
Lyrically, the album encompasses subjects for which Pulp were to become well known, including sexual encounters, social class and voyeurism.

Robyn Strachan retrospectively describes the opener "Joyriders" as setting the tone for the album with "acerbic observation and lurking seediness and decay".

"She's a Lady" takes much of its musical inspiration from Gloria Gaynor's "I Will Survive".

The album closer, "David's Last Summer", is notable as being one of Pulp's most narrative songs, delivered entirely in spoken word apart from the chorus despite being an uptempo track.

Release and aftermath

The CD edition of the album included a new remixed version of the song “Babies”, the original version of which was previously released as a single in 1992.

The album was preceded with two singles: "Lipgloss" and "Do You Remember the First Time?". The new mix of "Babies" was also released as a single as part of the Sisters EP.

The album was a long-awaited breakthrough for Pulp in the UK becoming their first charting album reaching #9 and later certified Gold.

A CD Deluxe edition of His 'n' Hers was released on 11 September 2006. It contained a second disc of B-sides, demos and rarities. The vinyl version of the Deluxe edition was released in 2012.

Track listing

Personnel
Pulp
 Jarvis Cocker – vocals, School piano, Vox Marauder guitar, EMS Synthi A
 Russell Senior – Fender Stratocaster guitar, violin, bowed bass
 Candida Doyle – Farfisa Compact Professional II organ, Stylophone 350S, Korg Trident II, Fender Rhodes piano, Wurlitzer piano, Hohner clavinette, Steinway grand piano
 Nick Banks – drums, percussion, treated cymbals, timpani, fire extinguisher
 Steve Mackey – Fender Jazz Bass

Artwork
 Philip Castle – Pulp portrait
 Kevin Westerberg – original photograph

Notes

References

External links

His 'n' Hers at YouTube (streamed copy where licensed)
 

Pulp (band) albums
1994 albums
Island Records albums
Albums produced by Ed Buller